Williams Oswaldo Ochoa Gallegos (born 6 June 1978) is a Mexican politician affiliated with the PRI. As of 2013, he served as Deputy of the LXII Legislature of the Mexican Congress representing Chiapas.

References

1978 births
Living people
People from Tuxtla Gutiérrez
Institutional Revolutionary Party politicians
21st-century Mexican politicians
Deputies of the LXII Legislature of Mexico
Members of the Chamber of Deputies (Mexico) for Chiapas